Compsoctena himachalensis is a moth in the Eriocottidae family. It was described by Pathania and Rose in 2004. It is found in India (Himachal Pradesh).

Etymology
The species is named for Himachal Pradesh, where the species has been recorded.

References

Moths described in 2004
Compsoctena
Moths of Asia